Rishika, in Indo-Aryan languages – and especially within the context of Hindu religious texts – may refer to different things.

 Rishi, an inspired poet of Vedic hymns.
 A member of the Rishikas, a possibly-mythical tribe of Central Asia and South Asia, which is mentioned in historical and religious texts.
Rishika Kingdom, an ancient kingdom inhabited by the Rishikas.